Okruzhnaya is a railway station on the Savyolovsky suburban railway line originating at Moscow Savolovsky railway station. It opened in 1911, and was reconstructed in 2018, to allow better interchange with the Moscow Central Circle line.

Since September 2018, Aeroexpress trains to Sheremetyevo International Airport from Belorussky Railway Station have stopped at Okruzhnaya only for boarding to the airport and exit from the airport. Since November 2019, Aeroexpress trains operate as MCD service towards Odinsovo and on Aeroexpress fare towards Sheremetyevo Airport.

Future plans involve forming a single large interchange complex by combining this station with the similarly named stations of the Moscow Metro and the Moscow Central Circle.

Gallery

References

Railway stations in Moscow
Railway stations of Moscow Railway
Railway stations in the Russian Empire opened in 1911
Line D1 (Moscow Central Diameters) stations